Isabel Wiseler-Santos Lima (born 29 December 1961) is a Luxembourgish politician of th Christian Social People's Party (part of the European People's Party group) who has been serving as a Member of the European Parliament (MEP) since the 2019 European elections.

Early life and career
Lima was born on 29 December 1961 in Odivelas, Portugal. She moved to Luxembourg with her parents at the age of three. She graduated from University of Sorbonne Nouvelle Paris 3 in 1984 with a master's degree in Modern Literature. The following year, Lima joined the Christian Social People's Party. After graduating, Lima became a teacher at the private school Fieldgen. She was member of the board of the school from 2013 to 2017.

Political career

Career in local politics
Lima has been a municipal councillor of the city of Luxembourg since 2005. In 2017, she became an alderman in the council.

Member of the European Parliament
Lima stood as a candidate for the Christian Social People's Party in the 2019 European parliament election. She was elected as one of its two MEPs in Luxembourg. In the European Parliament, Lima is a member of the Committee on Foreign Affairs and the Subcommittee on Human Rights. Since 2021, she has been part of the Parliament's delegation to the Conference on the Future of Europe. 

In addition to her committee assignments, Lima is part of the delegation to the Turkey-EU Joint Parliamentary Committee. She is also a member of the MEPs Against Cancer group.

Personal life
Lima is married to politician Claude Wiseler, and has three children. The couple met while at university.

References

Living people
1961 births
People from Odivelas
MEPs for Luxembourg 2019–2024
Christian Social People's Party MEPs
Christian Social People's Party politicians
21st-century women MEPs for Luxembourg